Beaumetz-lès-Loges is a commune in the Pas-de-Calais department in the Hauts-de-France region in northern France.

Geography
A farming village located 7 miles (11 km) southwest of Arras at the junction of the N25 with the D7 road.

Population

Sights
 The church of St. Michel, dating from the fifteenth century.
 Vestiges of an old castle.
 A World War I cemetery.

See also
Communes of the Pas-de-Calais department

References

External links

 The cemetery at Beaumetz

Communes of Pas-de-Calais